Kristína Michalaková (née Czafiková born 30 May 1985) is a former professional Slovak tennis player. On 27 February 2006, she reached her highest WTA singles ranking of 243.

Career
Michalaková had a successful junior career,  Her career-high world doubles ranking as a junior was world No. 5. In 2002 Michalaková won a prestigious tournament for juniors Osaka Mayor's Cup partnering Emma Laine (Grade A). She has won 1 singles and doubles titles on the ITF Women's Circuit.

ITF junior results

Doubles (4–5)

References

External links 
 
 

1985 births
Living people
Tennis players from Bratislava
Slovak female tennis players
21st-century Slovak women